The 2023 U Sports Men's Volleyball Championship was held March 17–19, 2023, in Hamilton, Ontario, to determine a national champion for the 2022–23 U Sports men's volleyball season. The third-seeded Trinity Western Spartans defeated the fourth-seeded Sherbrooke Vert et Or in straight sets to claim the seventh championship in program history.

Host
The tournament was hosted by McMaster University at the Burridge Gymnasium on the school's campus. This was the sixth time that McMaster had hosted the tournament with the most recent occurring in 2018.

Participating teams

Championship bracket

Bronze medal match

Gold medal match

Consolation bracket

Awards

Championship awards 
 Championship MVP – Mathias Elser, Trinity Western
 R.W. Pugh Fair Play Award – Montreal Carabins

Mikasa Players of the Game 
Trinity Western: Mathias Elser
Sherbrooke: Zachary Hollands

All-Star Team 
Sam Cooper, McMaster
Jordan Canham, Alberta
Jonathan Portelance, Sherbrooke
Yoan David, Sherbrooke
Brodie Hofer, Trinity Western
Jesse Elser, Trinity Western
Mathias Elser, Trinity Western

References

External links 
 Tournament Web Site

U Sports volleyball
2023 in men's volleyball
McMaster University